Logandale may refer to:
Logandale, California
Logandale, Nevada